The 2014–15 Minnesota Golden Gophers men's basketball team represented the University of Minnesota in the 2014-15 college basketball season. Led by second year head coach Richard Pitino the Golden Gophers, members of the Big Ten Conference, played their home games at Williams Arena in Minneapolis, Minnesota.

Previous season
The Golden Gophers finished the season 25–13, 8–10 in Big Ten play to finish in seventh place. They advanced to the quarterfinals of the Big Ten tournament where they lost to Wisconsin. They were invited to the National Invitation Tournament where they defeated High Point, Saint Mary's, Southern Miss, Florida State and SMU to be the 2014 NIT Champions.

Departures

Incoming recruits

Roster

Schedule and results

|-
! colspan="9" style="text-align: center; background:#800000" | Exhibition 

|-
! colspan="9" style="text-align: center; background:#800000"|Regular season

|-
! colspan="9" style="text-align: center; background:#800000"|Big Ten regular season

|-
! colspan="9" style="text-align: center; background:#800000"|Big Ten tournament

References

Minnesota Golden Gophers men's basketball seasons
Minnesota
2014 in sports in Minnesota
2015 in sports in Minnesota